Sanglaphu is a mountain peak location at  in northeast of Sikkim, India.

Location 
The mountain is part of the Dongkya range. On its western flank, the water flows from Gurudongmar Glacier to Gurudongmar Lake, which lies in the headwaters of the Lachen Chu, which in turn feeds the Teesta River. On the opposite side of the glacier is the main summit of Gurudongmar . The southern flank of the Sanglaphu is drained from the Lachung Chu.

Climbing history 
Sanglaphu was first climbed on October 1, 1991, by mountaineers from Sonam Gyatso Mountaineering Institute, Gangtok. The team consisted of Kalden, Beniwal, Tamang, Dawa, Passang, Nima Sangay, Choudhary, Rawat, Mahendra Pal, Ganesh and Pushpa.

References 

Mountains of Sikkim
Six-thousanders of the Transhimalayas